Aagt Jafies or Aagt Jansdr (d. in Haarlem 2 August 1572) was a Dutch arsonist, known as an informant of suspected heresy.

Aagt Jafies was a religious woman in service as an informant of the heresy hunter Jacob Foppens, who became mayor of Haarlem in 1569. She spied on people and turned over those who did not subject to blackmail to Foppens for heresy. Among her most known victims was Anneke Ogiers (1570). When Haarlem rebelled against Spain in 1572, Jafies and Foppens left the city: shortly afterward, however, Jafies was discovered to have organised fires in the city. She was sentenced for arson and executed by burning. Her death was frequently used by the propaganda during the war.

References 
 Els Kloek (13 January 2014) inghist.nl DVN, een project van Huygens ING en OGC (UU), Jafies, Aagt, in: Digitaal Vrouwenlexicon van Nederland   
 A.J. van der Aa (1852) Biographisch woordenboek der Nederlanden. Deel 1 [Jafies Aagt]
 Theodorus Schrevelius, Harlemias ofte De eerste stingtinghe der stadt Haerlem (Haarlem 1648) 298.
 P.C. Hooft, Historien (Amsterdam 1656) 246-248.
 W. van den Heuvell, ‘Aagt Jafies, of de aanslag op Haarlem’, in: Idem, Neerland’s roem. Historisch romantische episoden uit den tachtigjarigen oorlog (Amsterdam 1841) 1-192 [geromantiseerde vertelling].
 J. van de Capelle, Schout Foppens en Aagt Jafies. Historisch romantisch tafereel uit den tachtigjarigen oorlog (Amsterdam 1848) [historische roman, gebaseerd op het historisch onderzoek van de schrijver voor zijn Beleg en de verdediging van Haarlem].
 Willem Janszoon Verver, Memoriaelbouck. Dagboek van gebeurtenissen te Haarlem van 1572-1581, J.J. Temminck ed. (Haarlem 1973) 12 [vermelding van de terechtstelling].
 Joke Spaans, Haarlem na de Reformatie. Stedelijke cultuur en kerkelijk leven, 1577-1620 (Den Haag 1989) 41-42.

Year of birth unknown
1572 deaths
Dutch people of the Eighty Years' War
Executed Dutch women
Arsonists
Haarlem
People executed by the Netherlands by burning